Wanderings may refer to:

Synchronistic Wanderings, a compilation album by American rock singer Pat Benatar
The Wanderings of Oisin, an epic poem published by William Butler Yeats in 1889
The Wanderings of Oisin and Other Poems, the first collection of poems by William Butler Yeats
Wanderings of Sanmao, a Chinese animated TV series based on the manhua character Sanmao
Wanderings: Chaim Potok's History of the Jews, first published in 1978 by Knopf